Montague  is a census-designated place and  unincorporated community in Montague County, Texas, United States. It is the county seat of Montague County and had an estimated population of 400 in 2000, according to the Handbook of Texas. Its population was 304 as of the 2010 census.

Geography
Montague is located at  (33.6648266, -97.7205857), near the intersection of State Highways 59 and 175 in central Montague County.

Demographics

2020 census

As of the 2020 United States census, there were 261 people, 90 households, and 60 families residing in the CDP.

History
The community was named for Daniel Montague, an early surveyor. A post office opened in 1860.

By 1880, an estimated 400 residents lived in the community. They supported five businesses, three churches, a school, and the only flour and grist mills in the county. Montague was incorporated in 1886. That year W.A. Morris and C.C. White tried to raise funds to construct an independent rail line to connect Montague with Bowie, but they were unable to gain a sufficient amount. Bypassed by the railroad, the community suffered isolation and lack of growth. Residents of the town voted to dis-incorporate the community in 1900.

In 1915, an estimated 300 people lived in Montague. That figure reached a low of 284 in 1947. As highways were constructed following World War II, and more people and freight traveled by automobiles and trucks, a modest recovery began. The community began growing again by the 1970s. In 1990 and 2000, around 400 residents lived in the community.

Education
Public education in Montague is provided by the Montague Independent School District, which serves students in grades pre-kindergarten through eight. Ninth through twelfth graders attend high school in nearby Nocona or Bowie.

Climate
The climate in this area is characterized by hot, humid summers and generally mild to cool winters.  According to the Köppen Climate Classification system, Montague has a humid subtropical climate, abbreviated "Cfa" on climate maps.

See also
List of Texas county seats

References

External links

Montague ISD – Official site.
Montague County, Texas – Official site.

County seats in Texas
Unincorporated communities in Texas
Census-designated places in Texas
Census-designated places in Montague County, Texas
Populated places established in 1858
1858 establishments in Texas